This article displays the qualifying draw of the 2011 Guangzhou International Women's Open.

Players

Seeds

  Noppawan Lertcheewakarn (moved to Main Draw)
  Mădălina Gojnea (qualifying competition)
  Zarina Diyas (qualified)
  Zhang Ling (qualifying competition)
  Alla Kudryavtseva (withdrew)
  Hsieh Su-wei (qualified)
  Wang Qiang (second round)
  Hsu Wen-hsin (first round)
  Nicha Lertpitaksinchai (qualifying competition)
  Chan Chin-wei (qualifying competition)

Qualifiers

  Xu Yifan
  Zhao Yijing
  Zarina Diyas
  Hsieh Su-wei

Qualifying draw

First qualifier

Second qualifier

Third qualifier

Fourth qualifier

References
 Qualifying Draw

2011 - qualifying
Guangzhou International Women's Open - qualifying